Asheqan-e Abedin (also Romanized as ‘Āsheqān-e ‘Ābedīn; also known as ‘Āsheqān-e ‘Ābedīn Beyg) is a village in Howmeh-ye Shomali Rural District, in the Central District of Eslamabad-e Gharb County, Kermanshah Province, Iran. At the 2006 census, its population was 81, in 20 families.

References 

Populated places in Eslamabad-e Gharb County